Roman Volodymyrovych Zozulya (born 22 June 1979 in Moscow, Russian SFSR, Soviet Union) is a retired Ukrainian gymnast who last represented Ukraine at both the 2000 and 2004 Summer Olympics.

References

1979 births
Ukrainian male artistic gymnasts
Medalists at the World Artistic Gymnastics Championships
Gymnasts at the 2000 Summer Olympics
Gymnasts at the 2004 Summer Olympics
Living people
Olympic medalists in gymnastics
Gymnasts from Moscow
Ukrainian people of Russian descent
Medalists at the 2000 Summer Olympics
Olympic silver medalists for Ukraine
Universiade medalists in gymnastics
Universiade silver medalists for Ukraine
Universiade bronze medalists for Ukraine
Medalists at the 2003 Summer Universiade
European champions in gymnastics